Anja Leila Hemmikki Vammelvuo (7 October 1921, in Hausjärvi – 30 June 1988, in Tuusula) was a Finnish poet and writer.

References 

1921 births
1988 deaths
Finnish writers
Finnish poets